Crouter may refer to:

People
Mark Hanna Crouter (1897-1942), a United States Navy officer and Navy Cross recipient

Ships
USS Crouter (DE-11), a United States Navy destroyer escort in commission from 1943 to 1945